Trần (陳) or Tran is a common Vietnamese surname. More than 10% of all Vietnamese people share this surname. It is derived from the common Chinese surname Chen.

History 

The Tran ruled the Trần dynasty, a golden era in Vietnam, and successfully repelled the Mongol invasions of Vietnam, introducing improvements to Chinese gunpowder. During the Tran dynasty, arts and sciences flourished, and Chữ Nôm was used for the first time in mainstream poetry. Emperor Trần Nhân Tông was a great reformer of Chu Nom and the first emperor to use Chu Nom in Vietnamese poetry.

List of people surnamed Tran 
 Trần Bình Trọng (1259–1285), Vietnamese general 
 Trần Đại Quang (1956–2018), President of Vietnam
 Trần Độ (1923–2002), lieutenant general of the People's Army of Vietnam and political reformer
 Trần Đức Lương (born 1937), President of Vietnam
 Trần dynasty (1225–1400), rulers of Đại Việt/Vietnam
 Later Trần dynasty (1407–1413), period of unrest in Đại Việt/Vietnam
 Trần Hưng Đạo (1228–1300), prince, statesman, military commander of Đại Việt/Vietnam, whom repelled two out of three major Mongol invasions in late 13th century 
 Trần Kim Tuyến (1925–1995), chief of intelligence of South Vietnam
 Trần Lệ Xuân (1924–2011), also known as Madame Nhu, politician of South Vietnam
 Tran My Van (active 1986–2006), Vietnamese Australian academic in history and Asian studies
 Trần Ngọc Tâm (fl 1957–64), member of the Army of the Republic of Vietnam
 Trần Nhân Tông (1258–1308), given name Trần Khâm, emperor of Trần dynasty, 
 Trần Phú (1804-1931), Vietnamese General Secretary of Indochinese Communist Party
 Trần Quang Khôi (born 1930), general of Army of the Republic of Vietnam
 Trần Hưng Đạo, an imperial prince, statesman and military commander of Đại Việt military forces during the Trần dynasty.
 Trần Thái Tông (1218–1277), emperor of Trần dynasty,
 Trần Thánh Tông (1240–1290), given name Trần Hoảng (陳晃), emperor of Trần dynasty
 Trần Thiện Khiêm (1925–2021), officer in Army of the Republic of Vietnam
 Trần Thủ Độ (1194–1264), general, leader of Trần clan
 Trần Trọng Kim (1883–1953), courtesy name Lệ Thần, Vietnamese scholar, Prime Minister of Empire of Vietnam
 Trần Tử Bình (1907–1967), Vietnamese revolutionary, general of Democratic Republic of Vietnam, ambassador
 Trần Văn Đôn (1917–1998), general in Army of the Republic of Vietnam
 Trần Văn Hai (died 1976), brigadier general in Army of the Republic of Vietnam
 Trần Văn Hữu (1896–1984), president of government of Cochinchina, Prime Minister of State of Vietnam
 Trần Văn Hương (1903–1982), president of South Vietnam
 Trần Văn Khắc (1902-1990), founder of Vietnamese Scouting movement
 Charles Tran Van Lam (1913–2001), Minister for Foreign Affairs for Republic of Vietnam
 Trần Văn Minh, also known as Sylvain Trần Văn Minh (1923–2009), diplomat, general of Army of the Republic of Vietnam
 Trần Văn Trà, Nguyễn Chấn, known as Trần Văn Trà (1918–1996), Vietnamese general
 Trần Văn Thủy (born 1940), Vietnamese documentary film director
 Trần Huỳnh Duy Thức (born 1966) Vietnamese engineer, entrepreneur, human rights activist, prisoner of conscience
 Trần Hiếu Ngân (born 1972), Vietnamese Taekwando athlete
 Trần Thu Hà, also known as Hà Trần (born 1977), Vietnamese singer, producer
 Levy Tran (born 1983), American actress, model
 Natalie Tran (born 1986), Australian video blogger
 Roni Tran Binh Trong (born 1987), Finnish singer
 Karrueche Tran (born 1988), American actress
 Trần Lê Quốc Toàn (born 1989), Vietnamese Olympic weightlifter 
 Kelly Marie Tran (born 1989), American actress
 Trần Thị Thùy Dung (born 1990), Miss Vietnam winner
 Lana Condor (born 1997), birth name Tran Dong Lan, American actress
 Thalia Tran, American actress

See also
 Chen (surname)

References

Vietnamese-language surnames
Surnames of Vietnamese origin

vi:Trần